Entoto Raguel Church (Amharic: እንጦጦ ራጉኤል ቤተክርስቲያን) is an Ethiopian Orthodox Tewahedo church on the Entoto Hills, 2.5km far away from Addis Ababa, in Ethiopia. Built by Emperor Menelik II in 1887, the church is one of oldest churches in Ethiopia.
There is an Ethiopian Orthodox Tewahedo Church painting art in the church's interior wall and decorated with hand painting.

Description
Built by Emperor Menelik II in 1877, Entoto Kidus Raguel Church is found on the Entoto Hills about 2.5km away from Addis Ababa. Alongside neighbor Entoto Maryam Church, it is one of oldest churches. Inside the church, there is an Ethiopian Orthodox Tewahedo Church painting art in the church's interior wall and decorated with hand painting. Visitors can visit its compound abandoned rock carved church chiseled in the rock 700 years. 

There is also small museum displaying old manuscripts, crosses, and other church relics.

References

Churches in Ethiopia
Religious organizations established in 1877